Alexey Kornienko may refer to:

 Alexei Kornienko (born 1954), Austrian conductor and pianist  
 Aleksey Kornienko (born 2003), Russian footballer 
 Alexey Kornienko (politician) (born 1976), Russian politician